Branahuie is a village on the Isle of Lewis in the Outer Hebrides, Scotland. Branahuie is within the parish of Stornoway, and is situated on the A866. It is also close to Stornoway, Stornoway Airport and Melbost.

References

External links 

 Visitor's guide for the Isle of Lewis
 Website of the Western Isles Council with links to other resources
 Disabled access to Lewis for residents and visitors
 
 A Guide to living in the Outer Hebrides, with most information pertaining to Lewis

Villages in the Isle of Lewis